The Gustave Braune House is a historic house at 236 Prairie Street in Eutaw, Alabama.

Description and history 
The two-story, timber-framed, Greek Revival-style house was built in 1850, and assumed its current form in about 1860. It has one main floor, with an octagonal upper story room projecting above the center of the main block and overlooking the property. The house takes its name from Gustave Braune, a jeweller.

It was added to the Alabama Register of Landmarks and Heritage on October 12, 1976, and subsequently placed on the National Register of Historic Places as part of the Antebellum Homes in Eutaw Thematic Resource on April 2, 1982.

References

External links
Photos of the Gustave Braune House

National Register of Historic Places in Greene County, Alabama
Houses on the National Register of Historic Places in Alabama
Houses completed in 1850
Properties on the Alabama Register of Landmarks and Heritage
Houses in Greene County, Alabama
1850 establishments in Alabama